Hard Knocks is an American comedy-drama television series that aired on the Showtime Network. It featured Bill Maher and Tommy Hinkley as ideologically opposed private detectives looking to make money by solving the problems of their wealthy clients.

Synopsis
Gower Rhodes and Nick Bronco open a private detective agency in the back of a restaurant to make money by solving cases. However, nothing seems to go their way.

Cast

Main Characters
Bill Maher as Gower Rhodes
Tommy Hinkley as Nick Bronco

Recurring and Guest Roles
Judith-Marie Bergan as Maggie
Babette Props as Terry
James Vallely as Silky
Gracie Harrison as Sheila Jesswalters

Episodes

Reception

Critical reception
John J. O'Connor of the New York Times called the show "something truly different." The show has also been reviewed in the Spartanburg Herald-Journal as "hard to watch," and in the Chicago Tribune as having woeful writing, unappealing characters, an infantile premise, and as "making programmers at the three networks look like charter members of Mensa."

Awards and nominations
Hard Knocks was nominated for a CableACE Award in 1988

Sources 
Hard Knocks (1987) on TV.com
Hard Knocks (1987 TV series) on imdb.com
Hard Knocks- Series Overview on nytimes.com
TV Review; 'Hard Knocks,' Sitcom on nytimes.com
US Copyright Office on copyright.gov

References

English-language television shows
1980s American sitcoms
1987 American television series debuts
1987 American television series endings
Television shows set in Los Angeles
Showtime (TV network) original programming